Lynn Township is one of sixteen townships in Clay County, Nebraska, United States. The population was 70 at the 2020 census. A 2021 estimate placed the township's population at 70.

See also
County government in Nebraska

References

External links
City-Data.com

Townships in Clay County, Nebraska
Hastings Micropolitan Statistical Area
Townships in Nebraska